William Stanford Davis (born 1951/1952) is an American actor. He is best known for his role as school custodian Mr. Johnson on the ABC sitcom Abbott Elementary (2021–present), for which he earned a nomination for Outstanding Supporting Actor in a Comedy Series at the 54th NAACP Image Awards. His career began with a minor role on the soap opera The Bold and the Beautiful in 1995 and later included recurring roles on the Showtime television series Ray Donovan and the Apple TV+ television series Swagger.

Life and career
Davis was born and raised in The Ville in the north of St. Louis, Missouri, where he attended an all-Black elementary school before going to an integrated school in fifth grade. After graduating from Northwest High School, he attended Lincoln University, a historically Black university (HBCU) in Jefferson City, Missouri. He was inspired to become an actor during high school, when a teacher brought him to see the Negro Ensemble Company perform. From high school to college, he was the frontman for the pop and R&B band The Fabulous Paramount Revue, which opened for The O'Jays among other acts before disbanding during the Vietnam War. He also worked as a radio personality at a country radio station in Texas before moving to Los Angeles to pursue a career in acting, inspired by seeing Sidney Poitier in the 1958 film The Defiant Ones. His first role was as a custodian on the soap opera The Bold and the Beautiful in 1995.

Davis is a member of the Actors Studio. He had minor roles on the TNT series Snowpiercer, on the HBO series Curb Your Enthusiasm and Perry Mason, on the OWN series If Loving You Is Wrong, and in the films So B. It, Please Stand By, Holly Day, Dead Women Walking, Adopt a Highway, and A Holiday Chance. He had recurring roles as Coach Max on the Apple TV+ series Swagger and as Potato Pie on the Showtime series Ray Donovan.

Davis began starring in the Quinta Brunson-helmed ABC sitcom Abbott Elementary as the character of Mr. Johnson, the eccentric longtime janitor of the show's titular elementary school, in 2021. He auditioned over Zoom and was meant to be a guest star but was soon brought on as a recurring character, appearing in all 12 episodes of the show's first season. He became a series regular in its second season, the first series regular role of his career. He partially based his portrayal of the character on his paternal grandmother, who he described as "filter-less". For his role on Abbott Elementary, he was nominated for Outstanding Supporting Actor in a Comedy Series at the 54th NAACP Image Awards in 2023.

Filmography

Television

Film

References

African-American male actors
21st-century American male actors
Actors Studio alumni
Male actors from St. Louis
Lincoln University (Missouri) alumni
Living people